The 1945 Sydney to Hobart Yacht Race was the inaugural running of the annual "blue water classic", the Sydney to Hobart Yacht Race. It was hosted by the Cruising Yacht Club of Australia based in Sydney, New South Wales.

The race was initially planned to be a cruise planned by Peter Luke, Jack Earl and the Walker brothers who had formed a club for those who enjoyed cruising as opposed to racing.

The plan was changed, however, when a visiting British Royal Navy Officer, Captain John Illingworth, famously suggested, "Why don’t we make a race of it?"
The inaugural race, like all those that have followed, began on Sydney Harbour, at noon on Boxing Day (26 December), before heading south for 630 nautical miles (1,170 km) through the Tasman Sea, past Bass Strait, into Storm Bay and up the Derwent River, to cross the finish line in Hobart.

The 1945 fleet comprised 9 starters. Of the 9 starters, 8 yachts completed the race. Illingworth's own vessel, Rani, won the inaugural race in a time of 6 days, 14 hours and 22 minutes.

Peter Luke's record for longest-ever time to finish the course stands to this day:
11 days, 6hours, and 20 minutes.

1945 Fleet
9 yachts registered to begin the 1945 Sydney to Hobart Yacht race. They are:

Results

See also
Sydney to Hobart Yacht Race

Notes

References
 
 
 

Sydney to Hobart Yacht Race
S
S
1945 in Australian sport
1946 in Australian sport
December 1945 sports events in Australia
January 1946 sports events in Australia
1940s in Sydney
1940s in Tasmania